The Mugello Tuscany Open was a golf tournament on the Challenge Tour, played in Italy. It was held for the first time in 2010 when Floris de Vries triumphed in a sudden-death playoff over Thorbjørn Olesen. It was last played in 2013.

Winners

External links
Coverage on the Challenge Tour's official site
Poggio dei Medici Golf Club official site

Former Challenge Tour events
Golf tournaments in Italy
Sports competitions in Florence
Recurring sporting events established in 2010
Recurring sporting events disestablished in 2013